Idrissa Keita (born 10 April 1977) is an Ivorian former professional footballer who played as a midfielder. He also held Spanish citizenship.

Club career
Keita was born in Abidjan. After starring for Ivory Coast at the 1997 FIFA World Youth Championship, he, alongside countryman Félix Dja Ettien, was bought by Spanish club Levante UD. The pair struggled mightily during their first months in the new reality, with Keita eventually failing to settle altogether and leaving in January 1999 for La Liga team Real Oviedo, being irregularly used during his stay and starting in 37 of his 48 games in the top division (the Asturians would be relegated in his third season).

In April 2001, Keita was briefly suspended by the Royal Spanish Football Federation for allegedly holding a false French passport. After five years with Oviedo, which included a loan in Portugal, he continued his career in Spain in its second and third tiers, in a stint in the country which spanned over a decade.

References

External links

1977 births
Living people
Footballers from Abidjan
Ivorian footballers
Association football midfielders
ASEC Mimosas players
La Liga players
Segunda División players
Segunda División B players
Levante UD footballers
Real Oviedo players
Real Oviedo Vetusta players
Algeciras CF footballers
Mérida UD footballers
Racing de Ferrol footballers
Marino de Luanco footballers
Primeira Liga players
C.D. Santa Clara players
Ivory Coast under-20 international footballers
Ivory Coast international footballers
Ivorian expatriate footballers
Expatriate footballers in Spain
Expatriate footballers in Portugal
Ivorian expatriate sportspeople in Spain
Ivorian expatriate sportspeople in Portugal